Clinopegma is a genus of sea snails, marine gastropod mollusks in the family Buccinidae, the true whelks.

Species
Species within the genus Clinopegma include:
 Clinopegma chikaoi
 Clinopegma decora
 Clinopegma isikawai
Clinopegma magnum

References

Buccinidae